Markell Carter (born July 29, 1989) is a former gridiron football middle linebacker. He was drafted by the New England Patriots with the 194th overall pick in the 6th round of the 2011 NFL Draft.

Early life
Markell was born in Bartlesville, Oklahoma on July 29, 1989 and later graduated from Bartlesville High School. He then attended Central Arkansas and played football for the UCA Bears.

Professional career

New England Patriots
After the 2011 NFL Lockout, Carter finally signed with the Patriots  and reported to training camp as one of the first two rookies to sign with the team along with tight end Lee Smith. He was released during final cuts but almost immediately re-signed to the practice squad. He was again released on June 7, 2012.

Calgary Stampeders
Carter signed with the Calgary Stampeders on March 11, 2013. In June, 2013, the Stampeders released Carter before training camp opened.

Orlando Predators
Carter was assigned to the Orlando Predators of the Arena Football League on July 25, 2013. He was with the Predators during their playoff game, but did not play. After the season, his contract expired making him a free agent.

Pittsburgh Power
Carter was assigned to the Pittsburgh Power on October 24, 2013.

Orlando Predators
On February 6, 2014, Carter was traded to the Predators, along with Ben Ossai, for Prechae Rodriguez.

Colorado Ice
On March 12, 2014, Carter signed with the Colorado Ice of the Indoor Football League.

References

External links
 
 
 
 Central Arkansas Bears profile

1989 births
Central Arkansas Bears football players
American football defensive ends
Canadian football defensive linemen
Living people
People from Bartlesville, Oklahoma
Players of American football from Oklahoma
New England Patriots players
Calgary Stampeders players
Orlando Predators players
Pittsburgh Power players
Colorado Crush (IFL) players
Montreal Alouettes players
American players of Canadian football